Modrejce is a settlement on the right bank of the Soča River north of Most na Soči in the Municipality of Tolmin in the Littoral region of Slovenia.

References

External links
Modrejce on Geopedia

Populated places in the Municipality of Tolmin